Pterodontia flavipes is a species of small-headed flies (insects in the family Acroceridae). Adult males are 5.5–10.5 mm in size, while adult females are 5–9 mm. The larvae are thought to enter their host spiders at the leg articulations. First instar larvae of the species have also been recorded attacking the mites Podothrombium and Abrolophus.

References

Acroceridae
Articles created by Qbugbot
Insects described in 1832
Taxa named by George Robert Gray